Granville is a town in Hampden County, Massachusetts, United States. The population was 1,538 at the 2020 census. It is part of the Springfield, Massachusetts Metropolitan Statistical Area. The town is named for John Carteret, 2nd Earl Granville.

History and description 
Granville was first settled by English colonists in 1736 and was officially incorporated in 1754, after the end of the Indian wars in 1750. Early settlers could get a  lot for free, providing they built a house and "put four acres in English hay". The population in Granville expanded quickly, peaking at 2,100 in 1810, when it rivaled Springfield. However, likely due to the rocky soil in New England, many settlers eventually migrated west, some establishing the town of Granville, Ohio.

Many historic homes dot Route 57, the main road through town. The village center, the old center, and West Granville center are all designated as historic districts listed on the National Register of Historic Places. Historic buildings include Granville's Old Meeting House (superb acoustics), the Stevenson house to its west, the West Granville Academy, and the West Granville Church. The village center features an old-fashioned country store, known for its cellar-aged cheese.

In addition to period architecture, Granville is the watershed for three reservoirs: Barkhamsted, the main source for the Hartford metropolitan district; Cobble Mountain, the main source for the city of Springfield; and Westfield, the main source for the city of Westfield, Massachusetts.  Much of the land in town is owned by the various water districts. Granville also has a number of active apple orchards.

Geography
Massachusetts Route 57 is the main east–west route through the town, and Massachusetts Route 189 leads south from the town center to the Connecticut border.

Granville is bordered on the north by Blandford and Russell, on the northeast by Westfield, on the east by Southwick, on the south by Granby, Connecticut, and Hartland, Connecticut, and on the west by Tolland.

Demographics

As of the census of 2000, there were 1,521 people, 556 households, and 409 families residing in the town. There were 595 housing units at an average density of 14.1 per square mile (5.4/km2). The racial makeup of the town was 98.69% White, 0.26% African American, 0.20% Asian, 0.39% from other races, and 0.46% from two or more races. Hispanic or Latino of any race were 0.66% of the population.

There were 556 households, out of which 36.9% had children under the age of 18 living with them, 63.7% were married couples living together, 6.8% had a female householder with no husband present, and 26.3% were non-families. Of all households 20.9% were made up of individuals, and 8.8% had someone living alone who was 65 years of age or older.  The average household size was 2.73 and the average family size was 3.19.

In the town, the population was spread out, with 27.6% under the age of 18, 4.9% from 18 to 24, 31.1% from 25 to 44, 25.4% from 45 to 64, and 10.9% who were 65 years of age or older.  The median age was 39 years. For every 100 females, there were 106.9 males.  For every 100 females age 18 and over, there were 100.9 males.

The median income for a household in the town was $53,148, and the median income for a family was $59,219. Males had a median income of $42,273 versus $30,380 for females. The per capita income for the town was $22,315.  About 1.8% of families and 3.4% of the population were below the poverty line, including 1.0% of those under age 18 and 9.8% of those age 65 or over.

Library
The Granville public library began in 1894. In fiscal year 2008, the town of Granville spent 0.68% ($31,979) of its budget on its public library—some $18 per person.

Education
Granville is part of the Southwick Regional School District, along with Southwick, and Tolland. Students attend Woodland School from grades K to 2, and Powder Mill School from grades 3 to 6. High school students attend Southwick Regional School from grades 7 to 12.

Points of interest 
 Granville State Forest
 Granville Center Historic District
 Granville Village Historic District
 Nobel & Cooley Drum Factory
 West Granville Historic District
 Wild Cat Aqueduct

Politics 
Granville, Massachusetts is a reliably Republican town. It has voted for the Republican presidential candidate in all 26 presidential elections since 1920. In 1924, Massachusetts native Calvin Coolidge received over 90% of the vote. From 1928 to 1972, even as the state of Massachusetts turned strongly Democratic, Granville remained strongly Republican, providing over 70% of the vote to the GOP in each election except one. In 1964, Republican nominee Barry Goldwater won Granville by a 20-point margin despite losing Hampden County Massachusetts by a margin of almost 50 points. In 1996, Granville was the only town in Berkshire, Hampshire, Franklin, Worcester, or Hampden county where Bob Dole received more votes than Bill Clinton.

Notable people
 Israel Barlow (1806–1883), Latter-day Saint pioneer, co-founder of Nauvoo, Illinois
 Samuel L. M. Barlow, Sr. (1826–1889), politician
 Isaac Chapman Bates (1779–1845), politician
 Lemuel Haynes (1753–1833), African American religious leader
 Daniel Penfield (1759–1840), merchant, soldier, town founder
 Oliver Phelps (1749–1809), merchant and politician
 Austin Scott (1848–1922), historian and college president
 Seward Smith (1830–1886?), lawyer, politician, and judge
 Sabrina Tavernise (born 1971), journalist

Annual events

Granville Harvest Fair 
Running through Columbus Day weekend in October, Granville's Harvest Fair attracts vendors and people from all over New England. The fair stretches along Route 57 from the Granville Village School to the Granville Town Hall (1.4 miles) and has shops lining the streets with a majority of the fair centered at the school, town hall and the town green. A busing system would travel between these three points, however, as of 2012 the fair removed the town hall from being the last stop in exchange for the Nobel and Cooley Drum Factory located on Water St. This reduced the overall travel length of the buses in half from 1.4 miles to 0.7 mile. The fair itself is primarily a crafts fair with most vendors selling handmade goods.

References

External links 

 Town of Granville official website
 MHC Survey Reconnaissance Town Report: Granville Massachusetts Historical Commission, 1982.

Springfield metropolitan area, Massachusetts
Towns in Hampden County, Massachusetts
Towns in Massachusetts